For the Canadian politician, see Barbara Sullivan.

Barbara K. Sullivan is a notable American marine biologist.  She is featured in an exhibit at the New England Aquarium for her work on comb jellies, also called ctenophores, and creatures such as chaetognatha and copepods.  She is a professor at the University of Rhode Island.

Sullivan has published extensively.

See also
 Laurence Madin

References

Living people
American marine biologists
University of Rhode Island faculty
Year of birth missing (living people)